Olaf Zinke (born 9 October 1966) is a former speed skater.

Zinke specialised in the 1,000 metres and 1,500 metres distances. In 1990, at a World Cup race in Helsinki he proved his skill at top level for the first time, finishing first in the 1,500 metres leaving Johann Olav Koss and Michael Hadschieff behind him, and the next day he won the 1,000 metres by outpacing Dan Jansen and Eric Flaim. He peaked again at the 1992 Winter Olympics in Albertville. Leaving the South Korean Kim Yoon-man behind by 0.01 seconds, Zinke won the 1,000 metres race and thereby the Olympic gold medal.

Personal records

Zinke has an Adelskalender score of 163.073 points.

References
 Olaf Zinke at SkateResults.com
 Olaf Zinke at DESG (Deutsche Eisschnelllauf Gemeinschaft) (in German)

1966 births
Living people
People from Bad Muskau
German male speed skaters
Olympic speed skaters of Germany
Speed skaters at the 1992 Winter Olympics
Speed skaters at the 1994 Winter Olympics
Olympic medalists in speed skating
Medalists at the 1992 Winter Olympics
Olympic gold medalists for Germany
Sportspeople from Saxony
20th-century German people